Alphonse Jolly (1810 – 10 February 1893) was a French dramatist and librarian.

External links
 

1810 births
1893 deaths
Librarians from Paris
Writers from Paris
Pseudonymous writers
French male writers